Elizabeth Sanderson Haldane  (27 May 1862 – 24 December 1937) was a Scottish author, biographer, philosopher, suffragist, nursing administrator, and social welfare worker. She was the sister of Richard Burdon Haldane, 1st Viscount Haldane and John Scott Haldane, and became the first female Justice of the Peace in Scotland in 1920. She was made a Companion of Honour in 1918.

Biography
Elizabeth Haldane was born on 27 May 1862 at 17 Charlotte Square, Edinburgh. Her father was Robert Haldane of Cloan House near Auchterarder, Perthshire and her mother was Mary Elizabeth Sanderson. She was educated by a succession of tutors and visiting schoolmasters. She wanted to go to college but it was too expensive and she was an only daughter tied to her widowed mother. Instead she educated herself by correspondence courses.

Haldane was persuaded by Octavia Hill to apply to the system of property administration which Hill had developed in London to the situation in Edinburgh and in 1884, at the age of 21, she became convener of the Housing Committee of the Edinburgh Social Union. She took nursing courses in the 1880s and subsequently became involved in establishing the Voluntary Aid Detachment (VAD) from 1908 onwards. She became a manager of Edinburgh Royal Infirmary around 1901 onwards. Her autobiography, From One Century to Another covers the period from 1862 to 1914. It lacks precise detail but gives a graphic picture of what it was like to be a well-to-do lady in the Victorian and Edwardian periods. She was intimate with royalty such as Queen Alexandra and was a personal friend of literary figures such as Matthew Arnold and George Meredith. She was taken out to dinner by Matthew Arnold who astonished her "by his knowledge of the neighbouring fishing streams, since he did not personally know the neighbourhood." She adds that: "I enjoyed his talk very much, as I had always had a great admiration for his work and felt it an honour to meet him. He had the stiff rather highbrow Victorian face one knew so well from pictures, but he was delightful to me."  George Meredith visited Cloan House in September 1890. She recalls that "It was quite unnecessary to entertain him, for the wonderful sentences poured from his mouth and we had but to listen."

In later life, she corresponded with her niece, Naomi Mitchison (née Haldane) who regarded her suffragist views as being out of date. Haldane accepted "the restriction of women's activities to the inside, the personal, the domestic" whereas Mitchison considered women to be equally free to pursuit their lives outside the home. She died on 24 December 1937 at St Margaret's Hospital, Auchterarder.

Haldane was an accomplished translator and put her considerable talents to use translating works of philosophy, including treatises by Descartes and Hegel. Along with G. R. T. Ross, she translated Descartes in a two-volume set, entitled The Philosophical Works, for Cambridge University Press in 1911.

Quote

Official appointments
 Vice-Chairman, Territorial Nursing Service;
 Member of QAIM Nursing Board;
 Deputy President of British Red Cross Society, Perthshire Branch;
 for some time a Manager of Edinburgh Royal Infirmary;
 Member of Scottish Universities Committee, 1909;
 Member of Royal Commission on the civil service, 1912;
 of Advisory Committees (National and Scottish) under the Insurance Act, 1912;
 of School Board since 1903;
 of County Authority for Education, 1919–22;
 of Scottish Savings Committee, 1916;
 of General Nursing Council, 1928;
 Central Council Broadcast Adult Education, 1930;
 Governor of Birkbeck College;
 late Governor of London School of Economics.

Publications 
Hegel's History of Philosophy (3 vols), translated with Miss Frances H. Simson, MA. London: K. Paul, Trench, Trübner, 1892–96;
 The Wisdom and Religion of a German Philosopher: Being selections from the writings of G. W. F. Hegel. London: Kegan Paul & Co., 1897;
 James Frederick Ferrier. (With introduction by R. B. Haldane) Edinburgh: Oliphant, Anderson and Ferrier, 1899, ("Famous Scots Series";
 Descartes: His Life and Times. London: John Murray, 1905;
 Descartes' Philosophical Works. (2 vols), with Professor G. R. T. Ross. Cambridge University Press, 1911/2;
 The British Nurse in Peace and War. London: John Murray, 1923;
 Mary Elizabeth Haldane: A Record of a Hundred Years, (1825–1925). (Edited) London: Hodder and Stoughton, [1925]; reprinted by Kennedy & Boyd (2009) in the  Naomi Mitchison Library Series;
 George Eliot and her Times: A Victorian Study. London: Hodder & Stoughton, 1927:
 Mrs Gaskell and her Friends. London: Hodder & Stoughton, 1930;
 The Scotland of our Fathers: A Study of Scottish Life in the Nineteenth Century. London: Alexander Maclehose & Co., 1933;
 Scots Gardens in Old Times, 1200–1800. London: Alexander Maclehose & Co., 1934;
 From One Century to Another: The Reminiscences of Elizabeth S. Haldane. London: Alexander Maclehose & Co., 1937;
 Articles in various magazines, and in Encyclopædia of Religion and Ethics

References

Sources 
 Who Was Who, A & C Black, 1920–2008; online edn, Oxford University Press, Dec 2007 available at http://www.ukwhoswho.com/view/article/oupww/whowaswho/U210623
 From One Century to Another: The Reminiscences of Elizabeth S. Haldane. London: Alexander Maclehose & Co., 1937.  Available here.
 British Library catalogue available at http://www.bl.uk.

Further reading

External links
 
 
Review of Haldane's 'Descartes: His Life and Times''' by Edward Cary published in the New York Times  in 1906
Haldane's entry in The Dictionary of Twentieth-Century British Philosophers (ed. by Stuart Brown, Hugh Bredin) viewable through Google Books
December 28, 1937 Times'' obituary for Haldane [readable as an image]

1862 births
1937 deaths
Elizabeth
Scottish justices of the peace
Members of the Order of the Companions of Honour
Writers from Edinburgh
Scottish biographers
Scottish women writers
Scottish non-fiction writers
Women biographers
People in health professions from Edinburgh